Goodrich is a city in Polk County, Texas, United States. The population was 271 at the 2010 census.

Geography

Goodrich is located at  (30.607139, –94.946995).

Demographics

As of the census of 2000, there were 243 people, 90 households, and 66 families residing in the city. The population density was 343.9 people per square mile (132.1/km2). There were 119 housing units at an average density of 168.4/sq mi (64.7/km2). The racial makeup of the city was 71.19% White, 14.40% African American, 2.88% Asian, 9.05% from other races, and 2.47% from two or more races. Hispanic or Latino of any race were 14.81% of the population.

There were 90 households, out of which 35.6% had children under the age of 18 living with them, 56.7% were married couples living together, 11.1% had a female householder with no husband present, and 25.6% were non-families. 23.3% of all households were made up of individuals, and 6.7% had someone living alone who was 65 years of age or older. The average household size was 2.70 and the average family size was 3.19.

In the city, the population was spread out, with 28.0% under the age of 18, 9.1% from 18 to 24, 27.6% from 25 to 44, 19.3% from 45 to 64, and 16.0% who were 65 years of age or older. The median age was 36 years. For every 100 females, there were 94.4 males. For every 100 females age 18 and over, there were 92.3 males.

The median income for a household in the city was $23,125, and the median income for a family was $26,786. Males had a median income of $23,438 versus $10,625 for females. The per capita income for the city was $9,354. About 25.7% of families and 34.6% of the population were below the poverty line, including 33.3% of those under the age of eighteen and 29.6% of those 65 or over.

Education
The City of Goodrich is served by the Goodrich Independent School District and is home to the Goodrich High School Hornets.

References

Cities in Texas
Cities in Polk County, Texas